Gortaclare is a small village and townland in County Tyrone, Northern Ireland. In the 2001 Census it had a population of 66 people (along with Moylagh). It lies within the Omagh District Council area.

References

See also 
List of towns and villages in Northern Ireland

Villages in County Tyrone
Townlands of County Tyrone